Gabar may refer to:

Places
 Fitzroy Island (Queensland)
 Gabar, Iran
 Gabar, Burgas Province
 Gabar, Kriva Palanka

People
 Gabar Singh Negi

Other
 Gabar goshawk, an African and Arabian bird of prey of the family Accipitridae